The Sámi Grand Prix, often abbreviated as SGP, is a Sámi yoik and song competition organized annually by the Sámi Music Festival organization, featuring participants from all corners of Sápmi. While the majority of its participants have been from the Norwegian side of Sápmi, Sámi from the Swedish, Finnish, and Russian sides have been increasingly participating in recent years too.

Each participant submits an original piece to be performed live in an auditorium in Kautokeino during the Sámi Easter Festival. Originally broadcast on the radio in a limited area, they have started to be shown on TV and livestreamed as well and can be watched from anywhere in the world. Listeners and viewers can cast their vote for their favorites in two categories. A combined televoting and jury result is calculated for each participant. The televotes and the jury votes each currently count for 50% of the participant's scores. The participants who receive the most votes in the song category and in the yoik category are declared the winners of these respective categories.

History
The first Sámi Grand Prix was held in 1990 with four participants in the yoik category and eight in the song category. All but one of the contestants was from the Norwegian side of Sápmi and most of these were from the municipality of Kautokeino. Each contestant performed a single yoik or song. The winning yoik was Báktevári searat, performed by Johan Anders Eira. The winning song was Muital midjiide, performed by Ellen and Magnus Vuolab of the band Sáve.

In 1993, the Áillohaš Music Award was created. It has been awarded every year since then, including 2020, to a Sámi musician to honor their contributions to the diverse world of Sámi music. The first recipient of this award was Mari Boine.

Since 2001, a CD album has been made of the competitors' performances each year, except for in 2014. That year's album was not released until the following year, when it was published in conjunction with the 2015 competition as a double CD.

Sámi Grand Prix had been held every year until 2020, when the entire Sámi Easter Festival was cancelled due to the uncertainty caused by the COVID-19 pandemic and the various restrictions imposed by the governments of the countries the participants live in. Even though the festival was cancelled, the 2020 Áillohaš Music Award was still awarded to an accomplished Sámi musician, this time to SlinCraze, a Sámi rapper who has spent more than 15 years so far pioneering new ways to use Northern Sámi in music.

The following year, the contestants from the cancelled contest were automatically entered into the 2021 edition of the Sámi Grand Prix. Due to the ongoing pandemic, the contest was held without a live show and the contestants' prerecorded performances were instead broadcast online.

Format 
The Sámi Grand Prix has two separate categories for competitors: a yoik category and a song category. Every year, participants compete in these two categories with unpublished, original pieces. At first, the number of yoikers and singers varied, but nowadays the contest is open to 10 individual yoikers and 6 singers or bands. The winner of each category receives a monetary prize of 20,000 Norwegian crowns, a diploma, and a stipend to be used for organizing and performing a concert on the main stage during the following year's Sámi Easter Festival.

In spite of its name, the yoik category is not limited to yoiks. Competitors in this category can also participate with other traditional vocal melodies such as the Inari Saami livđe, the Skolt Saami leuʹdd, and Southern Saami vuelie. As is traditional, these are unaccompanied by instrumental music. If the competitor wishes to use instrumental music, they must compete in the song category.

The song category is not restricted to a certain genre, but any lyrics in the songs must be in one of the Saami languages. Since 2006, the winner of this category has goes on to compete in what was then called Liet-Lávlut, a music competition for minority languages in Europe. Since the European competition has not been held every year, not every winner of the song category has been able to represent Sápmi in the competition.

Sámi Grand Prix winners

Winners of the yoik category

Winners of the song contest

The Áillohaš Music Award
The Áillohaš Music Award is an annual Sámi music award created to commerorate Nils-Aslak Áillohaš Valkeapää's 50th birthday in 1993. The winner of the award is announced on Holy Saturday during the Sámi Easter Festival. It is conferred by the municipality of Kautokeino, and the Kautokeino Sámi Association. The winner receives a monetary prize of 20,000 Norwegian crowns, a diploma, a piece of art, and a two-week stay at Lásságámmi.

References

External links
 Hvem-Hva-Når om Sámi Grand Prix (Who-What-When at the Sámi Grand Prix) at NRK

Recurring events established in 1990
Music competitions in Norway
Sámi music
1990 establishments in Norway
Indigenous music festivals